Guy Barruol (born 10 June 1934) is a French historian and archaeologist. He is director of research emeritus at the CNRS.

Biography 
Guy Barruol was born on 10 June 1934 in Mazan, Vaucluse, the son of Jean Barruol (1898–1982), a local historian and the author of numerous books on ancient and medieval Provence.

Barruol entered the CNRS in January 1962 as an intern, then was awarded the post of research assistant in 1963, research fellow in 1967, senior research fellow in 1967, and eventually became director of research in 1985. Since June 2000, he has been director of research emeritus at the CNRS.

Barruol was the director of the Antiquités Historiques of Languedoc-Roussillon from 1968 to 1982, and a member of the  until 1999.

Works

References 

20th-century French historians
20th-century French archaeologists
Living people
1934 births
Celtic studies scholars
Research directors of the French National Centre for Scientific Research